Qarabağ Futbol Klubu, commonly known as Qarabağ is an Azerbaijani professional football club, based in Baku, that competes in the Azerbaijan Premier League, the top flight of Azerbaijani football. The club originates from Aghdam but has not played in its hometown since 1993 due to the First Nagorno-Karabakh War. The club is now based in the capital city of Baku. Qarabağ plays its matches at the Azersun Arena and Tofiq Bahramov Stadium in Baku, which also serves as the venue for Azerbaijan national team matches.

Formed in 1987, Qarabağ were founding members of the Azerbaijan Premier League in 1992. One season later, they won their first league championship, becoming the first non-Baku-based club to win the Premier League title. Qarabağ is one of the two teams in Azerbaijan, along with Neftçi PFK which has participated in all Premier League championships so far.

In 2014, the club won the Premier League, their first league title in 21 years. Qarabağ have won the Premier League nine times and Azerbaijan Cup seven times. Qarabağ became the second Azerbaijani team after Neftçi PFK to advance to the group stage of a European competition, making its in the UEFA Europa League group stage in 2014–15 season. Qarabağ is the first Azerbaijani team to advance to the group stage of the higher UEFA Champions League, competing in the 2017–18 season. The club have played more UEFA matches than any other Azerbaijani team.

History

Soviet era (1951–1991)
The club was founded in 1951 as Mehsul after the Aghdam city stadium was built; there then began a serious effort towards the creation of a professional football team. Consequently, Qarabağ FK, playing under the name of Mehsul, took part in the 1966 Azerbaijani SSR championship. That year, the club reached fourth place in the local championship.

Qarabağ participated in the local championship for four consecutive years during which second place was their best result (achieved in 1969). After 1969, however, owing to carelessness and a lack of financial support, the team withdrew from the championships for almost ten years. In 1977, the team was reborn under name Shafaq. In 1982 Shafaq was the only representative of Aghdam in football. Between 1982 and 1987, the squad used the name "Cooperative society". In 1988, Qarabağ won the champions title in the Azerbaijan SSR local championship under its current name. In addition to championship medals, the club won the right to play in the Soviet Second League.

Effects of war and financial struggles (1991–2008)
On 23 July 1993, during the First Nagorno-Karabakh War, the city of Agdam was seized by Armenian armed forces, and the team was forced to move from Imarat Stadium to Baku, while the former head coach and player of the team, Allahverdi Bagirov, died in the war. Despite all these difficulties, in 1993, Qarabağ won the Top League as well as the Azerbaijan Cup. Financial problems plagued the club during the period from 1998 to 2001, and the club went through hard times although it became the first Azerbaijani team to win away from home in a European competition by defeating the Israeli side Maccabi Haifa in the 1999 UEFA Intertoto Cup thanks to a double strike from club legend Mushfig Huseynov. Qarabağ has also represented Azerbaijan in the UEFA Cup Winners' Cup and UEFA Cup many times.

These problems were alleviated in 2001, when one of the largest holding companies of Azerbaijan, Azersun Holding, starting sponsoring the team. The squad used the name of Qarabag-Azersun for two seasons, but then returned its original name in 2004.

Gurban Gurbanov era (2008–present)

In 2008, former Azerbaijani football star Gurban Gurbanov was appointed as head coach after the unexpected departure of Rasim Kara to Khazar Lankaran one week before the start of the 2008–09 season. Led by Gurban Gurbanov, Qarabağ have ignored a common strategy in Azerbaijani football: eschewing foreign signings in favour of nurturing local talent. Gurbanov brought with him a tiki-taka style of play, characterised by short passes, long periods of build-up and players interchanging positions.

Under Gurbanov, Qarabağ has become one of the most successful Azerbaijani football clubs in Europe (with three consecutive wins) and one which reached the UEFA Europa League play-off-round by beating Rosenborg in the UEFA Europa League, and also eliminated Honka of Finland. The achievements in European competitions marked Gurban Gurbanov as among the most successful Azerbaijani managers ever.

In 2010, the club set an Azerbaijani record for the most significant win in a European competition by beating Metalurg Skopje 4–1 in Baku and eliminating Wisła Kraków to reach the play-offs for the second year in succession. In 2011, the club duplicated the same record by beating Banga Gargždai 4–0 in Gargždai. The 2011–12 season ended in disappointing style for Qarabağ, however, as they finished in fourth place, leaving the club without European competition. In 2013, Qarabağ reached Europa League play-off-round for third time in their history.

In May 2014, Qarabağ earned its second league title after 21 years. A month later, by beating Red Bull Salzburg, the club became first Azerbaijani side to win in the third round of UEFA Champions League. In August 2014, the club reached Europa League play-off round for the fourth time in last five seasons. In 2014, Qarabağ qualified for the 2014–15 Europa League group stage, becoming the second Azerbaijani team to advance to this stage in a European competition. On 23 October 2014, after defeating Ukrainian club Dnipro Dnipropetrovsk 1–0, the team became the first Azerbaijani club to win a Europa League group stage match.

In 2017, after victory over the Sheriff Tiraspol, Qarabağ qualified for the UEFA Champions League play-off rounds for the first time. In the first leg they recorded a 1–0 victory over Danish side F.C. Copenhagen in Baku. Despite losing 2–1 in the second leg, Qarabağ won on away goals and became the first Azerbaijani team to reach the group stages of the UEFA Champions League. They were drawn in Group C alongside Chelsea, Atlético Madrid and Roma, where they managed to obtain two points in six games after two draws and four losses.

In July and August 2021, Qarabağ secured their first participation in the group stage of UEFA Europa Conference League. Qarabağ knocked-out Ashdod (0-0 and 1-0), AEL Limassol (1-1 and 1-0) and Aberdeen (1-0 and 3-1) in the qualifiers. On 27 August, Qarabağ was drawn on Group H of the 2021–22 UEFA Europa Conference League alongside Basel, Kairat and Omonia. Where they eventually placed 2nd in the group, making it to the rounds of 32.

Stadium 

The club have previously used Guzanli Olympic Stadium, which is situated in Quzanlı, the most populous municipality in the Agdam Rayon of Nagorno-Karabakh, Azerbaijan. The Imarat Stadium which was club's original home stadium was destroyed as a result of artillery attacks from Armenian military forces during the First Nagorno-Karabakh War.

In 2012, the construction of a new football stadium Azersun Arena was announced, which was opened in June 2015. Azersun Arena is a multi-use football stadium in Surakhani settlement of Baku, Azerbaijan.  It is currently used as the club's Azerbaijan Premier League home stadium and holds 5,800 people.

The Baku Olympic Stadium and Tofiq Bahramov Republican Stadium is used for UEFA Champions League and UEFA Europe League games, where the record attendance for Qarabağ occurred on 27 September 2017, in a UEFA Champions League group stage match attended by 67,200 fans against Roma.

Supporters
Although a large part of Qarabağ's support is drawn from the local Aghdam population, they remain immensely well supported in the rest of Azerbaijan. This is mainly due to their being the only team to represent the war-torn Nagorno-Karabakh region in the league. The club is a sole remnant of the past and a living symbol of hope and pride for over half a million Azerbaijani internally displaced people. In recent years, thanks to achievements on the pitch, the club has been able to inspire and initiate special youth projects enforcing stability and development in the IDP-settlements near the border of Nagorno-Karabakh.

The club have few supporting groups such as Imarat, Qarabağ Ordusu, Boys Qarabağ, and Ladies of Qarabağ. These groups often receive free tickets to Qarabağ's games, which helps Karabakh to have more support from fans.

Crest and colours

The crest on the club emblem is the symbol of the Karabakh. It is produced by English designers and based on the Karabakh horse. The horse stems from the club's nickname "The Horsemen"; although it was included on club programmes and scarves earlier, the crest was not displayed on the shirt until 2004. After Gurban Gurbanov's appointment, Qarabağ's attractive style of play led fans to call the team "Qafqazın Barselonası" ("Barcelona of The Caucasus"), which plays upon Barcelona's success in Europe. The club is sometimes called "Qaçqın Klub" ("The Refugee Club") after its conservative position on the Nagorno-Karabakh conflict and refugee problem in Azerbaijan.

Shirt sponsors and kit manufacturers
Qarabağ's traditional kit alludes to the club's location in Nagorno-Karabakh with the black and white representing light and darkness respectively. The club's kits are manufactured by İl"Azero and sponsored by Azersun, a Baku-based food producing company.

Recent seasons 

The season-by-season performance of the club over the last ten years:

European record

The club have participated in 18 editions of the club competitions governed by UEFA, the chief authority for football across Europe. These include 7 seasons in the Champions League, 13 seasons in the UEFA Cup and Europa League, two seasons in the Cup Winners' Cup and one seasons in the UEFA Europa Conference League and Intertoto Cup. Qarabağ has played six times in the Europa League after qualifying via the Champions League. Counting all of the 134 games the side have played in UEFA competitions since their first entry into the Cup Winners' Cup in the 1996–97 season, the team's record stands at 48 wins, 35 draws and 51 defeats.

Matches

UEFA club rankings

Updated 27 August 2022

Players

The squad list includes only the principal nationality of each player; several non-European players on the squad have dual citizenship with an EU country.

Current squad

For recent transfers, see 2022–23 Qarabağ FK season, Transfers summer 2022 and Transfers winter 2022–23.

Other players under contract

Out on loan

Reserve team

Qarabağ-2 plays in the Azerbaijan First Division from 2018.

Club officials

Technical staff

 Source: Traniers
 Source: Tech stuff

Club management

 Source: Steering
 Source: Management

Individual records
Lists of the players with the most caps and top goalscorers for the club in the league games (players in bold signifies current Qarabağ player).

Notable managers

Information correct as of match played 28 October 2022. Only competitive matches are counted.

Notes:
P – Total of played matches
W – Won matches
D – Drawn matches
L – Lost matches
GS – Goal scored
GA – Goals against
%W – Percentage of matches won

Nationality is indicated by the corresponding FIFA country code(s).

Honours
Qarabağ has won nine Azerbaijan Premier League titles, seven Azerbaijan Cup titles and one Azerbaijan Supercup trophy. The club is the first non-Baku based club to have won the Azerbaijan Premier League title. Qarabağ is one of the two teams in Azerbaijan, along with Neftçi PFK which has participated in all Azerbaijan Premier League championships so far.

Azerbaijan
Azerbaijan League
 Winners (9): 1993, 2013–14, 2014–15, 2015–16, 2016–17, 2017–18, 2018–19, 2019–20, 2021–22
 Runners-up (4): 1993–94, 1996–97, 2012–13, 2020–21
Azerbaijan Cup
 Winners (7): 1993, 2005–06, 2008–09, 2014–15, 2015–16, 2016–17, 2021–22
 Runners-up (3): 1995–96, 1997–98, 1999–00
 Azerbaijan Supercup
 Winners (1): 1994

USSR
 Azerbaijan SSR League
 Winners (2): 1988, 1990
 Runners-up (1): 1969
 Azerbaijan SSR Cup
 Winners (1): 1990

In popular culture
Qarabağ is featured on the football simulation game Pro Evolution Soccer 2015 and 2016.

Ban for hate speech
In October 2020, amid the Nagorno-Karabakh war, Qarabağ was called on for sanctions by Armenian Football Federation after the club's PR and media manager Nurlan Ibrahimov made a hate speech on social network calling to "kill all the Armenians, old and young, without distinction". UEFA announced about temporary banning the club's official from any football-related activity for "racist and other discriminatory conduct” targeting Armenians. Qarabag issued a statement saying Ibrahimov had "suffered psychological trauma" watching the news of Ganja and Barda missile attacks, while also urging its employees to "refrain from such sharing in this sensitive period, adhere to the principles of humanism and fully comply with the laws of our state". Ibrahimov was punished in an administrative manner for the calls he made expressing cruelty against another nation and inciting national, racial or religious hatred while behaving emotionally on social network. On November 26, UEFA officially banned the Qarabag official for life and fined the club €100,000. Shortly after the UEFA sanction, Ibrahimov was declared wanted in Armenia.

References

Further reading

External links

 Official website 
 Qarabağ FK at UEFA
 Qarabağ FK at FIFA

 
Football clubs in Azerbaijan
Association football clubs established in 1951
Nagorno-Karabakh
1951 establishments in the Soviet Union